The Purple Revolution may refer to:
The Purple Revolution: The Year That Changed Everything, 2015 book by Nigel Farage
 The Purple Revolution, 2005 events in Iraq